The canton of Plateau briard is an administrative division of the Val-de-Marne department, Île-de-France region, northern France. It was created at the French canton reorganisation which came into effect in March 2015. Its seat is in Boissy-Saint-Léger.

It consists of the following communes:

Boissy-Saint-Léger 
Mandres-les-Roses
Marolles-en-Brie
Noiseau
Périgny
La Queue-en-Brie
Santeny
Villecresnes

References

Cantons of Val-de-Marne